The 2018 UCI Europe Tour was the fourteenth season of the UCI Europe Tour. The 2018 season began on 25 January 2018 with the Trofeo Porreres, Felanitx, Ses Salines, Campos and ended on 16 October 2018 with the Nationale Sluitingsprijs.

French rider Nacer Bouhanni, who scored 1,124 points in the 2017 edition, is the defending champion from the 2017 UCI Europe Tour.

Throughout the season, points are awarded to the top finishers of stages within stage races and the final general classification standings of each of the stages races and one-day events. The quality and complexity of a race also determines how many points are awarded to the top finishers, the higher the UCI rating of a race, the more points are awarded.

The UCI ratings from highest to lowest are as follows:
 Multi-day events: 2.HC, 2.1 and 2.2
 One-day events: 1.HC, 1.1 and 1.2

Events

January

February

March

April

May

June

July

August

September

October

Final standings
For the 2018 season, the standings are calculated based upon the UCI World Ranking, with the ranking period being the previous 52 weeks.

Individual classification

Teams classification

Nations classification

References

External links
 

 
UCI Europe Tour
UCI Europe Tour
UCI